Tamiang River is a river in the province of Aceh, northern Sumatra, Indonesia,

Geography
The river flows in the northern area of Sumatra with predominantly tropical rainforest climate (designated as Af in the Köppen-Geiger climate classification). The annual average temperature in the area is 23 °C. The warmest month is June, when the average temperature is around 27 °C, and the coldest is October, at 22 °C. The average annual rainfall is 3483 mm. The wettest month is December, with an average of 522 mm rainfall, and the driest is March, with 178 mm rainfall.

See also
List of rivers of Indonesia
List of rivers of Sumatra

References

Rivers of Aceh
Rivers of Indonesia